Craig Jonathan Short (born 25 June 1968) is a former professional footballer who played as a centre-back.

Playing career
Short was born in Bridlington, East Riding of Yorkshire, England and after attending Amotherby primary school and Lady Lumley's School (Pickering) along with his brother Chris, he started his professional career at Pickering Town in the 1986–87 season. In October the following year they moved to Scarborough together, and in June 1989, Notts County together. However, while his brother was dogged by injury, Craig managed to ascend to greater things.

After four seasons for Notts County he moved to Derby County at the beginning of the 1992–93 season. He signed for £2.5million – a record for a club outside the top flight, and the highest fee for a defender at the time. He had been subject of a similarly high bid for ambitious Premier League side Blackburn Rovers, but opted to join Derby instead.

He completed more than 100 competitive games for both Derby and his next club, Everton who he joined three seasons later. He left the Merseyside club in 1999, joining Blackburn Rovers for £1.7 million – seven years after they had first tried to buy him.

Short endeared himself to fans as a mainstay in the 2000–01 team which won promotion and established itself back in the top flight.

However, he missed the 2002 League Cup final against Tottenham Hotspur through suspension, a match which Blackburn won 2–1. He did gain European experience in the following season, playing two games in the UEFA Cup.

After a 4–0 victory away to Birmingham City on 6 December 2003, manager Graeme Souness labelled Short the "perfect professional" after outplaying City striker Christophe Dugarry, who was sent off for elbowing Short.

In his final league game for Rovers on 7 May 2005 against Fulham, Short was handed the captain's armband by then manager Mark Hughes. However, in an out of character incident, he was sent off for violent conduct against Fulham's Luis Boa Morte after the Portuguese striker dangerously fouled Lucas Neill and Short pushed Boa Morte in the chest. He did however lead the team out for one final time a few weeks later in Tony Parkes' testimonial match, who was also leaving the club.

In the summer of 2005 he was allowed to move on to Sheffield United and was an important member of United's successful promotion campaign. He signed a one-year contract but only made two League Cup appearances that season. He was released at the end of the 2006–07 season and retired from football.

Retirement
After retirement, Short returned to his sailing business on Windermere, teaching sailing to the public and corporate teams, and delivering boats to their owners. He was featured on the Sky Sports series Where are they now?. His partner Carly Barnes is 
a sports lawyer. He has 3 children - Beth, Ellie and Jonathan-Lucas.

Return to football
In September 2008, it was announced that Short had joined Sheffield United's sister club, Ferencvaros, as a player-coach to Bobby Davison. He played two games for the club, both in the Hungarian League Cup.

On 30 November 2009, Ferencvaros officially signed Short as new manager; however, he left the Hungarian club because he did not possess the UEFA Pro Licence required in the Hungarian top division.

On 4 June 2010, he was appointed as the new manager of Notts County. He was sacked on 24 October 2010.

After a break from football, Short returned as Head of Recruitment for Derby County's academy. In 2013 Short was appointed first team coach at Blackburn Rovers where he had enjoyed a six-year spell as a player.

Short was appointed to Darren Wassalls coaching staff at Derby County for the closing stages of the 2015–16 campaign.

In August 2020, he was appointed assistant manager at Oxford United. Chris Short his brother, has had two spells with Oxford, as head of Sports Science.

Career statistics

Manager

Honours
Blackburn Rovers
Football League Cup: 2001–02

Individual
PFA Team of the Year: 1992–93 First Division, 1994–95 First Division

References

External links

1968 births
Living people
People from Bridlington
English footballers
Scarborough F.C. players
Notts County F.C. players
Derby County F.C. players
Everton F.C. players
Blackburn Rovers F.C. players
Sheffield United F.C. players
Premier League players
English Football League players
English football managers
Ferencvárosi TC managers
Notts County F.C. managers
Pickering Town F.C. players
English Football League managers
Derby County F.C. non-playing staff
Blackburn Rovers F.C. non-playing staff
English expatriate football managers
Footballers from North Yorkshire
Footballers from the East Riding of Yorkshire
Ferencvárosi TC footballers
Association football defenders
Expatriate football managers in Hungary